HMS Jersey was a 50-gun fourth rate ship of the line of the Royal Navy, built at East Cowes on the Isle of Wight, and launched on 24 November 1698.

She was converted to serve as a hulk in 1731, and was sunk in 1763.

Notes

References

Lavery, Brian (2003) The Ship of the Line - Volume 1: The development of the battlefleet 1650-1850. Conway Maritime Press. .

Ships of the line of the Royal Navy
1690s ships